Ross Cohen is the cofounder of BitTorrent Inc. He started the company in 2004 along with his brother Bram Cohen, where among other things he was involved in the Codeville project. He attended Carnegie Mellon University and Stuyvesant High School. He was forced out of the company in 2006.

References

1977 births
Living people
American computer programmers
Cypherpunks
Stuyvesant High School alumni
Carnegie Mellon University alumni
BitTorrent
Date of birth missing (living people)
Place of birth missing (living people)
21st-century American businesspeople